Mory Konaté (born 15 November 1993) is a Guinean professional footballer who plays as a midfielder for the club Sint-Truidense.

Professional career
Konaté began playing football late, and moved to Germany as student after his lack of footballing opportunities in Guinea. He began playing amateur football with Alfter in 2014, before signing a contract with Borussia Dortmund II in 2017. On 29 August 2019, Konaté transferred Sint-Truidense. Konaté made his professional debut with Sint-Truidense in a 5-2 Belgian First Division A win over K.A.S. Eupen on 8 February 2020, wherein he scored the opening goal.

International career
On 13 March 2020, Konaté was called up to represent the Guinea national football team. On 27 December 2021, he was included in Guinea's extended 2021 Africa Cup of Nations squad. He debuted with the Guinea national team in a 3–0 friendly loss to Rwanda on 3 January 2022.

References

External links
 
 
 DFB Profile
 FuPa Profile

1993 births
Living people
Sportspeople from Conakry
Guinean footballers
Guinea international footballers
Association football midfielders
Sint-Truidense V.V. players
Borussia Dortmund II players
Belgian Pro League players
Regionalliga players
Guinean expatriate footballers
Expatriate footballers in Germany
Expatriate footballers in Belgium
Guinean expatriates in Germany
Guinean expatriates in Belgium
2021 Africa Cup of Nations players